Mark Owen Lee, also known as M. Owen Lee and Father Owen Lee (May 28, 1930 – July 25, 2019), was an American-Canadian classics and music scholar and Roman Catholic priest.

Lee was born in Detroit, Michigan, United States, on May 28, 1930 to Robert Leo Lee and Helen (née Miller) Lee.

Father Lee was a member of the Basilian Fathers (C.S.B.) from 1951. He was the first person to be awarded a PhD in Classics at the University of British Columbia (in 1960), a professor emeritus of classics at the University of Toronto, a holder of four honorary degrees, and an author of more than 20 books on various subjects, such as opera, Richard Wagner, and Der Ring des Nibelungen.

Lee was also active as a commentator on musical topics. He was especially well known for his many contributions as intermission commentator, pianist, and quiz panelist on the Metropolitan Opera radio broadcasts.

Lee died in Scarborough, Toronto, Ontario, Canada on July 25, 2019 at the age of 89.

Major writings
 Word, Sound, and Image in the Odes of Horace (University of Michigan Press, 1969)
 Fathers and Sons in Virgil's Aeneid (SUNY Press, 1979)
 Wagner's Ring: Turning the Sky Round (Summit Books, 1990)
 First Intermissions (Oxford University Press, 1995)
 The Olive-Tree Bed and Other Quests (University of Toronto Press, 1997)
 Wagner: The Terrible Man and his Truthful Art (University of Toronto Press, 1999)
 A Book of Hours (Continuum Press, 2004)
 The Great Instrumental Works (Amadeus Press, 2005)
 The Best Films of Our Years (Authorhouse, 2007) 
 Athena Sings: Wagner and the Greeks (University of Toronto Press, 2003)
 Wagner and the Wonder of Art: An Introduction to Die Meistersinger (University of Toronto Press, 2007)
 A Season of Opera: From Orpheus to Ariadne (University of Toronto Press, 1998)

References

1930 births
2019 deaths
Classical music radio presenters
Writers from Detroit
Academic staff of the University of Toronto
American Roman Catholic priests
American writers about music
20th-century American non-fiction writers
Congregation of St. Basil
20th-century American male writers
American male non-fiction writers
American classical scholars
Wagner scholars
American Latinists
Canadian Latinists